Michael Aspinall (born 31 October 1939 in Stockport) is a British musicologist and singer. He lectures and writes on singers and singing, contributes to collections of essays, and provides many commentaries for liner notes of historical recordings.

Aspinall is well known for his opera parodies.

External links

References

English musicologists
1939 births
Living people
Writers from Stockport